The 2016 Georgia Southern Eagles football team represented Georgia Southern University in the 2016 NCAA Division I FBS football season. The Eagles played their home games at Paulson Stadium in Statesboro, Georgia, and competed in the Sun Belt Conference. They were led by first-year head coach Tyson Summers. They finished the season 5–7, 4–4 in Sun Belt play to finish in sixth place.

Schedule
Georgia Southern announced its 2016 football schedule on March 3, 2016. The 2016 schedule consists of 5 home and 7 away games in the regular season. The Eagles will host Sun Belt foes Appalachian State, Louisiana–Lafayette, Louisiana–Monroe, and Troy, and will travel to Arkansas State, Georgia State, New Mexico State, and South Alabama. Georgia Southern will skip out on two Sun Belt teams this season, Idaho and Texas State.

The team will play four non–conference games, one home game against Savannah State from the Mid-Eastern Athletic Conference (MEAC), and will travel to three road games against Georgia Tech from Atlantic Coast Conference (ACC), Ole Miss from the Southeastern Conference (SEC) and Western Michigan from the Mid-American Conference (MAC).

Game summaries

Savannah State

@ South Alabama

Louisiana–Monroe

@ Western Michigan

@ Arkansas State

@ Georgia Tech

@ New Mexico State

Appalachian State

@ Ole Miss

Louisiana–Lafayette

@ Georgia State

Troy

References

Georgia Southern
Georgia Southern Eagles football seasons
Georgia Southern Eagles football